Seismic moment is a quantity used by seismologists to measure the size of an earthquake.  The scalar seismic moment  is defined by the equation
, where
 is the shear modulus of the rocks involved in the earthquake (in pascals (Pa), i.e. newtons per square meter)
 is the area of the rupture along the geologic fault where the earthquake occurred (in square meters), and

 thus has dimensions of torque, measured in newton meters. The connection between seismic moment and a torque is natural in the body-force equivalent representation of seismic sources as a double-couple (a pair of force couples with opposite torques): the seismic moment is the torque of each of the two couples. Despite having the same dimensions as energy, seismic moment is not a measure of energy. The relations between seismic moment, potential energy drop and radiated energy are indirect and approximative.

The seismic moment of an earthquake is typically estimated using whatever information is available to constrain its factors.  For modern earthquakes, moment is usually estimated from ground motion recordings of earthquakes known as seismograms.  For earthquakes that occurred in times before modern instruments were available, moment may be estimated from geologic estimates of the size of the fault rupture and the slip.

Seismic moment is the basis of the moment magnitude scale introduced by Hiroo Kanamori, which is often used to compare the size of different earthquakes and is especially useful for comparing the sizes of large (great) earthquakes.

The seismic moment is not restricted to earthquakes. For a more general seismic source described by a seismic moment tensor  (a symmetric tensor, but not necessarily a double couple tensor), the seismic moment is

See also 
Richter magnitude scale
Moment magnitude scale

Sources

.

.

.

.

Seismology measurement
Moment (physics)